Malschwitz (German) or Malešecy (Upper Sorbian) is a municipality in the east of Saxony, Germany. It belongs to the district of Bautzen and lies 6 km northeast of the eponymous city.

The municipality is part of the recognized Sorbian settlement area in Saxony. Upper Sorbian has an official status next to German, all villages bear names in both languages.

Geography 
The municipality is situated in the Upper Lusatian flatland.

Several villages belong to the municipality:

References 
 Trudla Malinkowa/Weldon Mersiovsky (ed.): Malschwitz. Malešecy. A Wendish Village in Lusatia. Serbin 2018, 

Populated places in Bautzen (district)